Tigers in India constitute more than 70% of the global population of tigers. Tiger is officially adopted as the National Animal of India on recommendation of the National Board for Wildlife since April 1972. In popular local languages, tigers are called baagh or sher. The Bengal Tiger (Panthera tigris tigris [NCBI:txid74535]) is the species found all across the country except Thar desert region, Punjab and Kutch region. These can attain the largest body size among all the Felidae, and therefore are called Royal Bengal Tigers. Skin hides measuring up to 4 meters are recorded. The body length measured from its nose to the tip of the tail can reach up to 3 meter and it can weigh up to 280 Kilogram with male being heavier than the female. The average life expectancy is about 15 years. However, they are known to survive for up to 20 years in wild. It is solitary and territorial. Tigers in India usually hunts chital (Axis axis), sambar (Cervus unicolor), barasingha (Cervus duvacelii), wild buffalo (Bubalis arnee) nilgai (Boselaphus tragocamelus) and gaur (Bos gaurus) and other animals such as the wild pig (Sus scrofa) for prey and sometimes even other predators like leopards and bears. There are instances of Elephant calves (Elephas maximus) hunted by tigers. 

The tiger is estimated to have been present in India since the Late Pleistocene, for about 12,000 to 16,500 years.Tigers are found in 20 states of India with a variety of habitats including grasslands, mangrove swamps, tropical and sub-tropical forests, as well as shola forest systems and from plains to mountains over 6000 feet. The tiger is classified as Endangered in the IUCN's Red List of Threatened Species. Tigers throughout the Asia are found across 12 regional tiger conservation landscapes (TCLs), of which India is home to 6 global priority TCLs for long-term tiger conservation significance which harbors more than 60% of the global genetic variation in the tiger species. 

India is one of the Founding members of the intergovernmental platform of Tiger Range Countries – Global Tiger Forum headquartered in New Delhi. With a global share of 17% human population and 18% livestock population within 2.4% land area of the world, India has successfully managed to conserve the single largest population of free ranging wild tigers in the world effectively trying to reverse a century of decline. Several initiatives in the form of amendments to the Wildlife Protection Act, creating the "National Tiger Conservation Authority", delineating inviolate Core Areas in Tiger Reserves and incentivised voluntary relocation program, among many others have been critical in securing the survival of key tiger populations, the biodiversity, and the ecosystem services of the forests they inhabit. The Project Tiger Division under Ministry of Environment, Forest and Climate Change is dedicated for conservation efforts in a scientific way using advanced technological tools. The Government of India increased the budget allocation for tiger conservation from INR 185 crore in 2014 to INR 300 crore in 2022.. India is committed to secure the livelihoods of its citizens while simultaneously minimizing its impact on its wildlife conservation goals. In 2022, 54th tiger reserve in India was declared in Ranipur Wildlife Sanctuary, Uttar Pradesh, it being the State's fourth tiger reserve.

Tigers are present in different landscapes across the country. Some landscapes are having rich and viable population with adequate habitat and abundance of prey. Then are some landscapes which are prone to human interference but have potential to support improved tiger population. Unfortunately, there are some habitats where once thriving tiger population has now disappeared. As of 2020, it is estimated that nearly 30% of tiger population in India is present outside the Tiger Reserves. While other tiger range countries with relatively more economic prosperity have failed to protect this endangered species, India has lived up to its global commitment for tiger conservation and achieved the target of doubling its population (TX2) ahead of the set time-frame. Despite all the odds ranging from population stress to the demands of development and livelihoods, India has successfully managed to achieve the fine balance between modernization and conservation owing to the people's traditional, cultural and religious tolerance to all forms of life that cohabit with them.

Common names
In India, it is known by different names in different languages
Bengali, Baagh (বাঘ)
English, Tiger
Gujarati, Vāgha (વાઘ)
Hindi, Baagh (बाघ)
Kannada, Huli (ಹುಲಿ)
Malayalam, kaṭuva (കടുവ)
Marathi, Vāgha (वाघ)
Manipuri, Kei (কৈ)
Punjabi, Śēra (ਸ਼ੇਰ)
Tamil, Puli (புலி)
Telugu, Puli (పులి)
Urdu, Sher (شیر)

Characteristics
Tiger is a large, heavy bodied Cat with dominant shade of reddish-orange (pale yellow ochre to burnt sienna) and black stripes arranged irregularly, with a coat of smooth short hair. The ventral parts with chin, throat, breast and belly are generally white on colour with black stripes. In some tigers, brows and cheeks can also be white. Males have prolonged whiskers. Tigers in the plains tend to grow bigger in size compared to those in hilly areas. Tigers measuring up to 12 feet were often recorded a century ago. A full grown male can reach 10 feet in length. British Naturalist Robert Armitage Sterndale recorded of Lieutenant-Colonel Boileau hunting a 12 feet tiger in 1861. Its hide is said to have measured 13 feet 5 inches. He also mentions Colonel Ramsay killing a 12 feet tiger. There are many noted instances of tigers in India over 10 feet killed during British rule. Loss of healthy gene-pool due to excessive hunting can be attributed to relatively smaller size of present day tigers. These big cats are in fact good swimmers. Tigers can endure thirst for substantial amount of time. In one instance recorded by British naturalist George P. Sanderson, two wounded tigers were caught in net during hot weather and they survived without water for 10 days. Tigers cannot climb but the claw markings on the tree bark can be found up to a height of 10 feet. Tigers are known to be cannibals and sometimes scavengers.

British Military Officer, Alexander Angus Airlie Kinloch, an enthusiastic tiger-hunter in his book published in 1885 observes It is rarely that tigers become man-eaters, probably on account of there being such abundance of game and cattle for them. Unless provoked, the tiger will rarely attack a man, but does his best to get away quickly.  

Sir Samuel Baker, a Naturalist as well as a Big Game Hunter, revealed that it was rare for a tiger to attack any human being when suddenly and unexpectedly disturbed. He mentioned  The truth is that the tiger seldom attacks to actually kill, unless it is driven, or wounded in a hunt. It will frequently charge with a short roar if suddenly disturbed, but it does not intend to charge home, and a shout from a native will be sufficient to turn it aside; it will then dash forward and disappear, probably as glad to lose sight of the man as he is at his escape from danger.

Mythology and Culture
The Mahābhārata, an epic poem of ancient India's Sanskrit literature authored by Vyāsa, having originated in Vedic Period, consists of 18 parvas (books). The fifth Parva, Udyoga Parva, has 10 parts and 199 chapters. One of its shloka reads  निर्वनो वध्यते व्याघ्रो निर्व्याघ्रं छिद्यते वनम् ।तस्माद्व्याघ्रो वनं रक्षेद्वनं व्याघ्रं च पालयेत् ॥
nirvanō vadhyatē vyāghrō nirvyāghraṁ chidyatē vanamtasmādvyāghrō vanaṁ rakṣēdvanaṁ vyāghraṁ ca pālayēt.
which can be translated as 
 Do not cut down that forest with its tigers! Let not the tigers be driven from that forest! There can be no forest without tigers, and no tigers without a forest. The forest shelters the tigers and tigers guard the forest!

This philosophy holds true in present times as well. Tiger is admired and feared alike in Indian mythology. Goddess Shakti (Durga) rides on the tiger. Many deities across the country such as Dingu-Aneni (in North-East India), Bonbibi (in West Bengal), Sabarimala Ayyappan (in Kerala), Huliraya (in Karnataka), Vaghdeo or Vaghoba (in Maharashtra) and Chandraghanta are associated and venerated with tiger. Puranas and folklore often mention tiger as vahana for many of the religious figures. The Matsya Purana while narrating Shiva's marriage with Sati, describes some of the Ganas, the Shiva's attendants, having a face resembling that of a tiger. Harivamsa Purana often uses qualities of a tiger as adjectives. 

One Buddhist mythological tale suggest that Gautama Buddha in his past incarnation presented himself to a tigress as food when she was about to cannibalize her own cubs. This highlights compassion, the greatest virtue in Buddhist philosophy. Taoism depicts tiger as one of its prominent element in its temples.

Tiger images can be seen in the cave paintings from mesolithic era found in the archaeological site of Bhimbetka rock shelters. Tiger featured on the seals discovered in Mohenjodaro and Kalibangan shows its significance in the ancient Indus civilization and culture. Earliest known pictorial depiction of Shiva wearing tiger skin are from Kushana Period. Tiger holds religious and cultural significance for many adivasis in India. Kharia, Bhaina, Savar (or Saur), Parja tribes and Kusro sept in the state of Madhya Pradesh has totems of tiger. Baigas consider tiger as their brother. Gonds are known for propitiating the tiger as they see it as a protector. Korku worships Baghdeo (Tiger God). For the Murias, Chitan Deo (Tiger God) is the god of good hunting. Bhagashwar (Tiger God) is worshiped by the Bharias with a belief that they won't be killed by a tiger. Koyas people consider Konarzu as their Tiger God.  It is a well known fact that tribal people who share their lands with this top predator abstain from killing them as they consider it to be sacred. Traditionally, India has always had a culture of conserving forests and the wildlife in its nature.

Hunting of tigers by Islamic Invaders can be traced back to the Mughal cultural links with Mongol and Timurid ancestry which practiced hunting of big cats (lions, in their region) as a ritual "to formalise any kind of authority" and considered killing them as a good omen for the kingdom. Conversely, if the hunting was unsuccessful and the animal escaped, it would invite trouble for the kingdom.

Foreign naturalists identified that tigers were regarded by the natives with a divine awe which prevented its killing by locals, even when they had power. European religious magazines and publications played crucial role for introducing tigers to their youth and children. While promptly acknowledging being unknown to this "terrific animal" which was "not an inhabitant of bible land", English missionaries when passing through jungles "for the purpose of preaching the gospel to, and distributing religious books, among the poor benighted heathen" often encountered what they called "most savage and destructive of animals". On confronting this big cat, many a times they would lose the life of their fellow missionaries. Then would ask to the readers back in their country  What do you think it was? Why, it was the body of the poor man who had been killed. ... It was, indeed, a horrid and painful sight, and one which I shall never forget. On looking at it my blood seems to curdle in my veins. ... Youthful reader, did you ever feel thankful that you were born in a country where you are not in danger of being killed and eaten by those cruel and blood thirsty beasts? 
Missionaries would also point out that  In many places, the inhabitants appear to have resigned the dominion to the tigers, and take few precautions against them; regarding them as sacred. 

The popular myth that tigers are known to suck blood of its prey was disproved more than a century ago.

History

Arthashastra, an ancient Indian political treatise authored by Kautilya more than two thousand years ago, mentions of vyaala vana (wildlife and tiger reserve) which was a protected area in the kingdom by the Royal Command. King Ashoka of the Maurya Empire rejected hunting as a royal hobby.

From time immemorial, humans and tigers have co-existed throughout India. Tiger is elusive and avoid humans under normal circumstances but never charges unless wounded, or in defence of its young cubs. However, there are instances where tigers have attacked humans and cattle as result of which villages were abandoned owing to the neighbourhood of these animals. But killing the tiger was never seen as a solution to the problem. In fact, tigers are revered and worshiped in the forests and grasslands it shared with people throughout the region.

However, the foreign invaders and rulers saw capturing or hunting of tigers as a symbol of masculinity and an adventurous sporting event. Killing of this charismatic wild animal, often considered "merciless blood sucking beast" was an extension of justifying kingship, building the empire and establishing sovereignty. Indulging in hunting of this top predator was considered as a "Royal Privilege" by Mughals through which they could exercise their authority over the native subjects and natural world. This regal sport portrayed rulers as "heroes" capable of slaying the fiercest of the beasts and destroying the "evil" lurking around. Despite the prevalence of tiger hunting as a royal sport for centuries, the consequences were larger during the British Raj due to the hunters' use of far superior firepower, and their hobby to hunt shared by a lot of colonial aristocrats led to further depletion. Hunting events were chronicled in detail by the British officers in their personal diaries, memoirs, official gazetteers and their photographs to establish extravagance and might of the British Empire in India. British rulers enacted Forest Act of 1878 which enabled them to treat forest area as hunting grounds to eradicate tigers legitimately which were subsequently labelled as vermins. Killing of tiger involved considerable danger and the hunting of a tiger had been considered a manly and a courageous feat with game, trophies being collected as the symbols of valor and prestige. Accounts of British royalty photographed aside dead tiger carcasses during the late 19th and early 20th centuries depict the construction of the successful conquest of Indian nature, thus symbolizing the imperial, masculine identities desired by the British.

In the early 19th century, Bishop Heber has written a poem for the English youth and children in which he mentions about tigers in India.  Our task is done! On Ganga's Breast The sun is sinking down to rest; And moor'd beneath the tamarind bough, Our bark has found its harbour now. With furled sail and painted side, Behold the tiny frigate ride. Upon her deck, mid-charcoal gleams, The Muslim's savoury supper steams, While all apart, beneath the wood, The Hindu cooks his simpler food. Come walk with me the jungle through; If yonder hunter told us true, Far off, in the desert dank and rude, The Tiger holds his solitude; Nor taught by secret charm to shun The thunders of the english gun; A dreadful guest but rarely seen, Returns to scare the village green. 

A manager at Isaac A. Van Amburgh's menagerie described to people in other parts of world about these tigers from India as  ... Glutting himself with the blood of his victims, he is a fit emblem of cruelty. ... though gutted with slaughter, (tiger) is not satisfied - but continues the carnage and seems to have its courage only inflamed by not finding resistance. He is the only animal whose spirit seems untamable: neither force nor constraint, violence or flattery can prevail in the least on his stubborn nature. The caresses of the keeper have no influence on his heart of iron; and time, instead of mollifying its disposition only serves to increase its fierceness and malignity. The tiger snaps at the hand that feeds it, as well as that by which it is chastised - every object seems considered only as its proper prey, which it devours with a look, although confined by bars and chains, still makes fruitless efforts as if to show its malignity when incapable of exerting its force. ... In short the beast may be said to be possessed of a devil, and no human power can instill into him the attributes of love and kindness.

Colonial rulers established postal services in India for their effective administration. To shorten the time taken to deliver the post, these men would enter into the jungles which were otherwise undisturbed by human activities. Often there were instances involving the postman being attacked by Tigers. Such tigers were brandished as Man-Eaters and hunted down by British officers.

Often the elite British rulers in India would come up with a book publication narrating the exaggerated tales of their adventurous and "valor acts" of killing the tiger catered to the English audience back home. These books largely shaped the perception of European foreigners who liked to believe that by killing the tiger they were doing a favor to the native population. Lieutenant Colonel Frank Sheffield in his widely popular book How I Killed the Tiger wrote,  I had the satisfaction of knowing that I had rid the community of dangerous pest. The tiger in India is looked upon as a common enemy. All classes are in mortal dread of him. ... There is, therefore, great rejoicing over the death of a tiger  The press in Britain would then eulogize these incidents of tiger shooting which gave rise to the craze of Big Game Hunting in India. Press opinions on the heroic acts of their countrymen in the colonized India were notable in Daily Chronicle, United Service Gazette,  The Field, Daily News, The Graphic, Land and Water, Examiner, Standard, Hampstead & Highgate Express, The Guardian, The Daily Telegraph and The Navy and Army Illustrated among others. Articles published in the press would attract young Englishmen to visit Indian subcontinent for tiger-shooting.

When the adult parent tiger was killed, cubs would be caught and sailed to the land of British. Tigers were kept as pets among few Englishmen. There are accounts of tigers being tamed and showing docile behavior. However, there have been instances when caged Tigers from the menagerie have escaped. In October 1857 a tigress escaped from confines of Charles Jamrach who has purchased a lot of animals brought from British ruled colonies on the shores of London. A 9 year old boy playing on street was attacked and rescued. Mr. Edmonds from Birmingham later purchased this tigress for £200 (equivalent to 18,000 pound sterling in 2022) in his personal collection and put it as an exhibit with advertising "The tiger that swallowed the child in Ratcliff Highway" Later this tigress escaped to kill another Lion in Edmond's menagerie.

George P. Sanderson, a British official posted in erstwhile Mysore State, wrote "May the day be far distant when the tiger shall become practically extinct!"

Tiger fights used to be held in Lucknow during the reign of last king of Awadh, Wajid Ali Shah and it is well documented that a dozen tigers were sold in market to highest bidder for ten rupees each. Tipu Sultan, the prince of Mysore state was also associated with Tiger.

In 1986, it was discovered that tigers were declining rapidly due to being poisoned, snared or shot and then smuggled out of India to supply medicinal manufacturers in China.

Chennai was earlier known as Puliyur, meaning Tiger Town. Mumbai (erstwhile Bombay) has recorded tigers in the vicinity till 1929. Major cities along the river Yamuna like Delhi and Agra once had free roaming tigers in the neighboring jungles.

Post-Indian Independence, the newly formed East Pakistan (present-day Bangladesh) had rich bounty of tigers in the Sundarban Districts of East Bengal. The administration advertised its plentiful natural heritage as "a sportsman's paradise". It invited people to "take part in this exciting sport" by  paying a "license fee".

Habitat and Ecology 
Global tiger population is confined to only 13 countries - India, Bangladesh, Bhutan, Nepal, Myanmar, Cambodia, China, Indonesia, Lao People's Democratic Republic, Malaysia, Russia, Thailand, and Vietnam. Of these, only in 8 countries can breeding tiger population be found in the wild. India, Nepal and Russia are the only countries that have successfully increased the tiger population through conservation efforts. As of 2022, the tigers are now likely to be extinct in Cambodia, Lao PDR and Vietnam.

It is an adaptable species that can survive in a wide variety of habitats and climates ranging from high mountains, mangroves swamps, tall grasslands, to dry and moist deciduous forests, as well as evergreen forests as witnessed in all over the geography of India. The reddish-orange with black stripes coat provide good camouflage in its environment. Tigers prefer a large territory, the size of which is determined by the availability of prey. It marks the territory by urine, feces, rakes, scrapes, and vocalizing. Tigers are now forced to compete for space with ever increasing human expansion. They have a tendency of using landscape features such as dirt roads, trails, foot paths, riverbeds and nullahs which often leads to public sighting.

Landscapes
India has five major tiger occupied landscape complexes which have their own unique geographical features and population of tigers

Shivalik Hills and Gangetic Plains
With an average width of 60 km and stretching across nearly 900 km from river Yamuna and Sharda in the west to Valmiki Tiger Reserve in the east, Shivalik and the Gangetic Plains landscape consists of three parallel geological zones - the Shivaliks, the bhabar tract and the terai plains ranging from Uttarakhand, Uttar Pradesh to Bihar. Shivaliks are the young fold mountains with elevation up to 1500 m situated between the Himalayas and Indus-Gangetic-Brahmaputra-Irrawaddy plains. Streams from Shivalik enter underground in the bhabhar region to re-emerge again in the terai zone which is marked by annual flooding, a high water table, shifting floodplains, vast swampy areas and hence with abundant tall grass species. India and Nepal share the forests in the terai region and Bhutan is also a significant part of this zone. This makes trans-boundary co-operation in the conservation efforts important.

High density of tiger population (up to 15 tigers per per 100 sq. km.) in this landscape can be attributed to existence of more than 15,000 sq km forested area with plenty of tiger prey base such as
Cervids - Kaakad (Muntiacus muntjak), Chital (Axis axis), Hog Deer (Axis porcinus), Sambar (Rusa unicolor) and the Barasingha (Rucervus duvaucelii)
Bovids - Blackbuck (Antilope cervicapra), Chousingha (Tetracerus quadricornis), Gaur (Bos gaurus), Goral (Naemorhedus goral), Serow (Capricornis thar) and Nilgai (Boselaphus tragocamelus)
Other Mammals - One-horned Rhinoceros (Rhinoceros unicornis) and Wild Boar or Pig (Sus scrofa)

Central India and Eastern Ghats
Central Indian and Eastern Ghats landscape includes all the area from semi-arid zone of Rajasthan,  central Indian plateau of Madhya Pradesh, Chhattisgarh, Jharkhand, Maharashtra (along with some part of Sahyadris), and Odisha to parts of the Eastern Ghats Andhra Pradesh and Telangana and Odisha Step-like geological formation can be seen at Chhota Nagpur Plateau (consisting of Hazaribagh, Ranchi and Koderma plateaus) along with the hills of Aravalli, Satpura and those in Eastern Ghats have an elevation range of 200 m to 1300 m. This hilly terrain with patches of shallow infertile soils has been a natural deterrent for extensive cultivation and hence many areas in this landscape remain forested. However, the historic continuation of ancient forests in Eastern Ghats with primitive forests of Central India along the Chhota Nagpur plateau is near extinction.

A huge network of Protected Areas with nearly half of the total Tiger Reserves of India can be seen in this landscape. Peninsular forests transitions into Thar desert through a semi-arid region located between part of north western Madhya Pradesh and Eastern Rajasthan. This varied habitat supports high biodiversity and is known for its tiger abundance. The landscape is undergoing massive degradation due to mining, infrastructure development and insurgency.

Wildlife habitats of this landscape are the most fragmented in India. With presence of four tiger populations that have more than 100 tigers each (with Kanha-Pench Block having more than 300 tigers) this landscape is home to a few endemic species such as Indian Wild Buffalo (Bubalus arnee) and Hard Ground Barasingha (Rucervus duvacelli branderi). Other common prey animals here are Blackbuck (Antilope cervicapra), Barking deer (Muntiacus muntjak), Chinkara (Gazella benetti), Chital (Axis axis), Chowsingha (Tetracerus quadricornis), Gaur (Bos gaurus), Mouse Deer (Moschiola indica), Nilgai (Boselaphus tragocamelus), Sambar (Rusa unicolor), Wild Pig (Sus scrofa)

The Western Ghats
Beginning from the River Tapi in North, running parallel to the Arabian Sea coast and stretching over 1600 km to end at Kanyakumari in South, the Western Ghats landscape ranges from Goa, Karnataka and Kerala to Tamil Nadu Total forest cover is about 1,01,467 sq. km. and this landscape has 11 notified tiger reserves as of 2018. The highest peak at Anaimudi is 2,695 m from mean sea level. This global biodiversity hotspot with vegetation ranging from grasslands, montane stunted evergreen forests (shola), tropical wet evergreen forests, moist deciduous to dry deciduous forests and dry thorn forests, is home to about 5,800 species of flowering plants, 500 species of birds and 120 species of mammals with a large number of them being endemic to this region. Illegal Quarrying, Mining, Hydroelectric Power Projects, Deforestation for timber and agricultural output with rampant monoculture, Hunting and Encroachment are the major ecological concerns which have resulted in irreversible habitat loss, disruption of habitat corridors thereby interrupting the gene flow in tiger population. It is estimated that in Karnataka, the state with second highest tiger population of 524 (SE 475 - 573) as per 2018 assessment, about 12% of forests have been completely destroyed since the year 2000.

North Eastern Hills and Brahmaputra Flood Plains
North Bengal Dooars, Brahmaputra Flood Plains and North Eastern Hill ranges together constitutes North Eastern Hills and Brahmaputra Flood Plains Landscape which ranges from across parts of Northern West Bengal, Assam, Arunachal Pradesh, Mizoram and Nagaland The fertile plains of Bengal Dooars are at the foothills of Eastern Himalayas and has vast tropical moist forests that extends into the Brahmaputra Valley which is about 750 km long and 80 km across surrounded by hilly terrain. This region has numerous protected areas, reserved forests and wetlands along the Brahmaputra River. The North Eastern hill region consists of eastern Himalayas extending from the Koshi Valley in Central Nepal to northwest Yunan in China and include North East India along with the hill districts of West Bengal. Garo, Khasi and Jaintia hills forms the Meghalaya plateau while located in the south-east, Mizoram has a major part of Lushai hills with Tripura having a small chunk. India-Myanmar border is along the Naga hills where as Assam is home for the Barail Range, Karbi-Anglong hills and the Cachar hills

With highly fertile land, many rivers and tributaries in the region, the mountains, valleys and the plains with an altitude ranging from 300 m to 6000 m, showcases contrasting features and a rich variety of wildlife. Tropical climate is predominant in valleys and rampant deforestation for extensive monoculture plantation threatens the survival of many endemic species found here. Apart from the usual tiger prey found in the rest of the country like Barking deer (Muntiacus vaginalis), Chital (Axis axis), Hog Deer (Axis porcinus), Sambar (Rusa unicolor), Swamp Deer (Rucervus duvaucelii), Water Buffalo (Bubalus arnee) and Wild Pig (Sus scrofa), the tigers in this landscape also prey on Himalayan Goral (Naemorhedus goral), Himalayan Serow (Capricornis thar), Red Goral (Naemorhedus baileyi), Bharal (Pseudois nayaur), Brow-Antlered Deer (Cervus eldi eldi), Leaf Deer (Muntiacus putaoensis), Pygmy Hog (Porcula salvania), Ibex (Capra ibex), Great Tibetan Sheep (Ovis ammon hodgsoni) and Tibetan Wild Ass (Equus hemionus kiang). Tigers are also known for hunting down Badgers (Arctonyx collaris), Otters (Lutrogale perspicillata) and sometimes baby Elephants (Elephas maximus), One-horned Rhinoceros (Rhinoceros unicornis)

With two important Tiger Conservation Units (TCUs), there are nine tiger reserves in this landscape which has a forest area of around 1,70,541 sq. km. Tibet Autonomous region of China, Bhutan, Nepal, Bangladesh and Myanmar are the neighboring countries that share their borders with this landscape thus making trans-boundary international cooperation an essential requirement for tiger conservation success.

Sundarban
Sundarban landscape consists of mangrove forests of southern part of West Bengal and extends into Bangladesh This important wetland is a global priority Tiger Conservation Landscape Unit covering an area of more than 10,000 sq km which was declared a World Heritage Site by UNESCO in 1987. Designated as Sundarban Biosphere Reserve with around 4,266 sq km area on the Indian side of the Sundarban (34%) is under highest protection for residing wildlife in comparison with Sundarban in Bangladesh (66%) having majority of area being open to harvest the forest produce.

Aquatic systems of the mangrove habitat are highly productive among the ecosystems. With a density of 3.6 tigers per 100 sq km in Sundarban landscape, they have adapted successfully to a more amphibious, saline, pneumatophore-filled existence. This region is also known for prevalance of high numbers of Man-Eater tigers. Chital (Axis axis), Wild Pig (Sus scrofa), Rhesus macaque (Macaca mulatta) and Lesser adjutant stork (Leptoptilos javanicus) are the major prey for tigers in Sundarban. Other fauna found here such as Water monitor (Varanus salvator), young Saltwater crocodiles (Crocodylus porosus) and possibly fish are also preyed upon by the local tigers. With rivers acting as natural geographical barriers, tigers crossing the water channels by swimming up to 400 m distance have been recorded. Being in an isolated habitat, the gene flow is highly restricted for tiger species in this landscape.

Decline
Organized poaching due to illegal international demand for tiger parts and products is the major threat to the lives of existing tiger population. Deforestation leads to habitat loss, fragmentation of tiger population and depletion in its prey numbers which in turn increases the human-tiger conflict when tigers enter human populated areas to target cattle as its prey. Tigers are now at increased risk of zoonosis through interaction with domestic animals. Free ranging dogs in vicinity of Protected Area are considered to be threat to both ungulates (which they hunt) and to the other larger carnivores like tigers, as a carrier for infectious diseases like rabies, parvovirus, and distemper.

Drastic fall in Tiger numbers can be attributed to large scale deforestation during British empire for the timber used in establishing vast network of Railways throughout India and increased tiger-shooting.

Since 2012, records with standardized data of tiger deaths in India is being maintained by the National Tiger Conservation Authority. During the period 2017 to 2021, 547 tiger mortality instances were documented across the country. 393 tiger deaths were due to natural causes where as 25 died due to poisoning, 9 were killed from snaring, 7 were eliminated by shooting, 55 dead tigers were seized, 22 got electrocuted and 33 poaching incidences were recorded.

Killing
A large number of tigers have been killed in medieval & colonial India to prove the pride, wealth, machismo and honour of the ruling elite. Shooting tigers was "a jolly-good sport". Post-independence, from 1947, India was hotspot for global hobby-hunters which accelerated the tiger killings till the Indian government banned it in 1972. The trophy-hunting industry in India at the time of ban was worth $4 million per year (equivalent of 432.8 million as of 2022)

Shikar
Establishment of Mughal Empire across the India saw rise in hunting the tiger as a sport for the elite. Mughal Emperor would often invite  Mongol, Rajput, Turk and Afghan nobilities for Shikar of the Tiger, which was seen as worthwhile opponent who evoked fear. While the Indians worshiped as well as feared this King of the Jungle, it had to be killed by the foreign invaders as a mark of asserting supremacy during their rule. Akbar preferred hunting tigers with bow and arrow while riding on a horse back or on an elephant where as Jahangir, who is known to have killed 86 tigers, went on foot for the hunt. Jahangirnama claims Shikar of a total 28,532 animals and 13,964 birds in the hands of Jahangir with first his killing made at the age of 12. Mughals were known to maintain the records of their royal hunting expeditions (Shikar). Animal contests such as tiger vs horned buffaloes and tiger vs tiger were common during the era.

Shikar employed the Mongol hunting tactic called Qamargah, in which many men served as "beaters" for encircling a huge area to drive-out and trap the tiger in fenced spot where the ruler sitting on a horse or elephant would kill the tiger. The hunter would often keep a part of tiger as trophy or souvenir.

Once Akbar took 4000 soldiers with him for Shikar. All his courtiers, noblemen and even his harem accompanied him. Infrastructure similar to the royal palace was created in the middle of the jungle. Sometimes, the Shikar lasted for months. Many paintings were created on this theme to hail the ruler. Cock-fights and duelling of pigeons and rams were made available whenever the king felt bored. Falcons and Cheetahs were reared as pets that assisted in making Shikar a success.

The princely state of Hyderabad had a good number of tigers in its wilderness. The dignitaries visiting the Nizam were taken for Shikar. On the jubilee celebration of Nizam, the prince gifted him 35 tiger skins which were killed in a month.

Big-Game Hunting
English naturalist Richard Lydekker in the book The Royal Natural History wrote, "Tiger is so intimately associated with the characteristic of India that it will always - and rightly - be regarded as the special emblem of that country"

British saw the killing of Tigers as an act of imperial subjugation of the Indian subcontinent. For the colonial rulers and British officers, the months of March, April and May was the Tiger-Hunting season as much of the grass would dry out during summer in the Northern India and chances of sighting and thus killing a tiger would be high. Big-game huntings are known to have killed around 9 tigers on an average day. They employed Shikaris (chief native trackers), Beaters along with Elephants & Mahouts (elephant handler) for their hunting expedition. It was ensured all the beaters are paid by the day, and each receives a gratuity if a tiger is killed. Monetary incentives lured native people to help foreigners in hunting games. An ordinary beater received from three to four paise a day when the beats have been blank, and double that amount when there has been a kill. There were generally be about fifty or sixty of them. Their leaders received double the above sums.

The roots of this animosity and thirst for killing a tiger can be traced back to incidences like one happened in 1812 - when a party of British officers dining in a jungle near Madras was attacked by a tiger - in which a life was lost. This created a lasting panic and fear among the British. At every opportunity, they would avenge this "ferocious beast". In another instance of 1792, son of Sir Hector Munro was ambushed by a tiger and mauled to death when he was out in jungle to hunt deer. Being a higher authority in the Military, his response was to take revenge by officially authorizing mass killing of tigers. Many officers were either badly wounded or killed on their Big-Game expedition. This in turn led to other officers violently taking up against the tiger.

British rulers directed native Indians to clear large areas of forests for timber and agriculture expansion. This increased the chances of man-tiger encounters which was otherwise rare. Only forest dwellers came in contact with usually shy and solitary tigers on regular basis but with no incidences of attacks. Loss of habitat and reduced number of preys often led tigers to venture out in human settlements where domestic cattle was an easy food. Increasing man-tiger conflict was seen by the British as a "problem to be solved".

William Rice, a British Army Lieutenant at 25th Regiment Bombay Native Infantry, in his journal published in 1857 mentions his "bag" consisted of 156 heads of "large game" with 98 tigers, one of which measured 11 feet and 11 inches from end of its nose, between the ears to tip of its tail. He uses terms like "fearful ravages", "rapacious pests", "India infested with wild beasts" while equating their killing to "notorious evils" requiring "remedy" and "exterminate such brutes". William Rice describes tiger-shooting as the most exciting and glorious sport this world affords and wrote 
I enjoyed splendid opportunities of observing the habits of these animals and ascertaining how they may best be killed.

Chambers's Journal of 1875 mentions Englishmen killing about 1200 tigers annually in the Bengal Province alone, which translates to more than 3 tigers a day.

British physician Sir Joseph Fayrer notes that in 1876, Bombay Presidency spent 43,598.12 rupees in killing 1,693 "noxious" tigers that were considered as "evil to be removed" so that "wild beasts will recede, and men will no longer worship, or reverence with superstitious awe, the creature that destroys them." He mentions that Central Provinces rewarded 50 rupees for killing a "full grown" tiger. Official records from Board of Revenue of Madras Presidency in 1876 shows 236 tigers were killed by the British which was almost similar to the number of tigers killed in 1875. From 1872-73, 391 tigers and before that 1866-69 an average of 186 tigers were killed each year as Madras Board of Revenue considered it "the bounden duty of government to do something for the destruction of wild animals and protection of life and property from their ravages." It rewarded up to 100 rupees for killing a tiger. Madras government briefly appointed Captain Caulfield with assistance of Inspector Mackenzie in Coimbatore district with a task of hunting down tigers in the area. The collector was instructed to ensure smooth hunting expeditions. The deputy commissioner of Buldhana in erstwhile Hyderabad State remarked that the pace of hunting has made tiger extinct in his district.

British officially killed 1,579 Tigers in the year 1878. In the year 1882, the British officials paid £4800 in rewards for killing 1,726 tigers. Col. Julius Barras who spent 28 years serving as British Army officer in colonial India, in his 1883 memoir admits aspiring to a "little amusement in the great jungles of India" and about the costs involved in big-game hunting, he wrote:
 As nothing can be more dreary than life in an Indian military cantonment, it will surprise no one to learn that sporting incidents, such as tiger-shooting... will form the chief attraction of the present work. Tiger-shooting was my principal amusement, and, as it is an expensive pastime, I think I cannot begin better than by pointing out a few of the more costly preparations which must be made before this sport can be indulged in, and by also indicating a few contingencies that may easily arise, and cost the adventurer a good deal more than he may have anticipated. For tiger-shooting the best and most highly finished weapons are indispensable. What, for instance, is the use of the finest lock and barrels if the wood of the stock is not sufficiently seasoned to bear, without warping, the fierce heat to which it is exposed under a May sun in the hottest parts of the tropics. No; everything down to the cartridges and the lining of the coat pockets, in which most people carry them, should be carefully looked to, and no inefficiency tolerated for the sake of economy.

Expenses such as the above can, of course, be reckoned upon before starting, but there are others of a less certain nature. Occasionally beaters are killed, and then the compensation paid to their families is often heavy. Or an elephant may be sacrificed, and then you would be expected to pay for him! But these are dismal considerations, and apt, perhaps, to damp the rising ardour! Still, if they are ever to be glanced at, surely it should be before we start on our wild career. Whatever may happen afterwards must be considered as part of the enjoyment, even if, like myself, we end in becoming crippled for life!
 

In the year 1886, records show a total of 1,464 tigers were killed in British India. Lt.Col. J.C. Fife-Cookson who arrived in erstwhile India as the Adjutant of the 65th Regiment of the British Army, begins his book Tiger-shooting in the Doon and Ulwar With Life in India (1887) by claiming there is no sport which is equal to tiger-shooting and the skin of the tiger, considered as a valuable trophy was reward of the hunting success. On his preference of going on hunt with one or two "friends"  rather than being in a large team of hunting "sportsmen" and not willing to "sacrifice personal control and management of the expedition", he wrote:
 In tiger-hunting the scene of chase is in the beautiful and wild Indian jungles, pervaded as they are by a feeling of solitude and romance... The tiger is the most cunning animal in the jungle, and your wits are pitted against his intelligence and instinct, while the other element of danger is certainly not wanting in most of the plans of hunting him... If the sportsman has only one or two companions, he experiences the enjoyment of an individual share in the management of hunting... I would by all means prefer to go with one friend. In this case we would please ourselves instead of becoming mere shooting-machines acting under the instruction of the chief of a large party, who is always chosen on starting in order to secure unity of action, and who makes all the arrangements.

Maharaja of Surguja killed 1,710 tigers in his hunting quests. George Yule, a British civil servant in Bengal Presidency had killed more than 500 tigers during his administration. Sir Geoffrey Slingsby Nightingale, a colonel in the Royal Army Medical Corps shot more than 300 tigers while serving in India. For the Maharaja of Rewa, shooting of 109 tigers, with the advent to guns, was considered auspicious for a prince when he was newly crowned as the King of the state. King George V on his visit to Colonial India in 1911 for his grand coronation, killed 39 tigers in a matter of 10 days Skin of one of these is on display at the Royal Albert Memorial Museum. In 1921, Duke of Windsor is known to have shot 17 tigers in one week. The Maharaja of Cooch Behar State killed 365 tigers as a sport. Col J Macdonald of Bengal Army, Revenue Survey killed 70 tigers. F.B. Simson of Bengal Civil Services, hunted around 180 tigers.

In 1924, General William Lendrum Mitchell, also known as "Father of US Air Force" was invited to colonial India as a guest of the then Viceroy, The Lord Irwin. He recounts his shooting of 2 tigers (9 feet 6 inch tigress and a 10 feet tiger) in two days and his wife killing one (a 10 feet 4 inch tiger) during a three day Big-Game Hunting with 800 beaters in Eastern India with Maharaja of Surjuga as The Hindu religion prohibits the taking of life of most animals, and, besides, the natives are not allowed to keep firearms; so, in spite of the dense population, animals of all kinds are comparatively secure... The jungle beasts (read: tigers) of India are very ferocious, while the inhabitants are practically unarmed and are unwilling to kill most animals on account of their religion. A fact which forcibly impresses the western travellers in India is the proximity in which the indigenous people and the animals of the fields and forest live. Wild creatures of all sorts are found at the doors of the huts... We had killed so many during our last three days that their pelts were not sufficiently dry to pack, so we had to spread them on top of the truck that was to carry our baggage south, allowing them to dry en route.

British officers often flaunted the size of their kill. Sir J.F. Yule have claimed killing tigers of "11 feet and odd inches" twice or thrice. Hon.J.R. Drummond, commissioner of Rohilkhand stated killing an 11 feet 9 inches tiger. Colonel D.G. Stewart affirmed hunting down an 11 feet 3 inch tiger. General Sir H. Green lay claim to assisting in killing of tiger in Surat that measured 11 feet 11 inch while he himself has shot a tiger of 10 feet 11 inches. Claude Clerk at Hyderabad is known to have killed a tiger measuring 11 feet 6 inches. However, Mr. C Shillongford who has hunted more than 200 tigers, declared killing a 12 feet 4 inch tiger in 1849 and another of 11 feet 4 inches in 1855. Sir Charles Reid claims hunting a 12 feet 3 inches tiger in Dehradun. Oriental Sporting Magazine of July edition in 1968 describes Mr. Henry Cave of Gondwara shooting down an 11 feet tiger. Mrs. Lawrie Johnstone stated shooting a tiger over 11 feet. Col Sleeman from Bengal Army said the trophy he possessed belonged to a tiger of size more than 12 feet which was killed in Jabalpur. Col. H. Shakespeare held that two of his trophies belonged to tigers measuring 11 feet 8 inch and 11 feet 6 inch respectively. Francis Trevelyan Buckland mentions in his book "Curiosities of Natural History" about presence of two 13 feet tigers and a 12 feet 7 inch tiger being killed by a British from 72 Highlanders. A tigress measuring 9 feet 6 inches is also mentioned. In the jungles of Midnapore, Maj. Gen. Sir W. R. Gilbert had killed a 12 feet 2.5 inch tiger in the year 1825.

"Heroic" acts of killing this "destructive foe" and "dreadful savage" thereby liberating the country from "tiger infestation" were published in journals, memoirs, newspapers and even in sports magazines of the British Empire.

Poaching

Poachers kill tiger for its trade in body parts like skin, teeth, claws etc. which are highly sought after in the Chinese traditional medicine and also used as display objects. A tigress scent-marks her vicinity with thick, pungent, musky fluid and announces her fertility to the other males in the area who compete for her. This makes a tigress vulnerable to poaching for her body parts to be used in making aphrodisiacs which is highly prevalent in China and Thailand. Some brothels in these countries are known to sell a sweet liquor steeped in tiger penis. Poachers in India kill and smuggle tigers to supply the increasing demands in neighboring country. Poachers are known to take advantage of man-tiger conflicts and kill the endangered animal with the help of troubled locals.

Earliest available records shows that there was a high demand for tiger parts among the English people. In 1886, tiger parts were traded in European markets with its skin/fur sold for nearly £6 (equivalent to 600 pound sterling in 2022) and its claw fetched about 5 shilling (equivalent to £25 in 2022). Tigers exceeding 11 feet were of very high value.

In the 1950s, a tiger pelt was sold for $50 in India. With high exports and increasing fashion trends and demands, fur, rugs and coats made of tiger skin were sold for $10,000 in U.S. and Europe during the 1960s. Around 1,000 Kg (2,200 pounds) of bones (estimated to be from 80 tigers) was seized in August 1993 at Delhi. The consignment was meant to be smuggled into China for their medicinal use.

By June 2004, it came to light that none of the tigers in Sariska Tiger Reserve survived in the protected area. However, government record showed presence of 18 tigers. This exposed the corruption and neglect in the Rajasthan Forest Department. Funds meant for conservation were siphoned off by the state government. Arrest of poachers revealed that killing the tigers in Sariska was easy job for them as the walkie-talkies of guards were non-functional and the check posts at wildlife areas manned by some 300 guards were abandoned during the monsoon season which provided easy access in and out of the tiger reserve for poaching. Security personnel with bamboo sticks or half-a-century old British era Lee-Enfield rifles often encountered poachers carrying Assault rifles and AK-47s.

Tiger skin was most sought-after for ceremonial clothing in China-controlled Tibet. However, this practice was put to an end when the Tibetan spiritual leader, Dalai Lama denounced the ceremonial clothing made of tiger and leopard skin. In 2006, reports emerged showing Chinese police officers laughing and posing with people wearing clothing made of tiger skin. These were sold in open markets of China despite the trade ban under UN convention. It was also reported that China was considering to lift the ban on bone trade from tigers raised in farms which could have negative consequences on tigers in India as there was no way to differentiate the bones from wild Indian tigers. The report showed Chinese businessmen purchasing tiger skin for home decor.

Certain communities in India are known for making fake tiger claws using the bones of livestock due to their high demand and value. 2018 survey showed high poaching cases at Amdarbad, Dampa, Dudhwa, Kanha, Melghat, Nagarhole, Palamau, Pench, Rajaji, Srisailam (NSTR) and Udanti-Sitanadi Tiger Reserves.

Human-Eaters
On 2 November 2018, a tigress named Avni (officially known as T1, age 6 years) who had two 10-month-old cubs was shot and killed near Borati village in the Yavatmal forests after more than a month-long search operation by a controversial civilian hunter Ashgar Ali Khan, son of India's most famous hunter Nawab Shafath Ali Khan, in collaboration with Maharashtra state forest department when she was accused of being a human-eater for past year and a half, held responsible for the death of 13 locals since June 2016. This reserve forest at Yavatmal has no records of having any tiger before and is 170 sq km patch that forms a part of greater Vidarbha tiger landscape and has Tipeshwar wildlife sanctuary nearby. Forensic investigation and DNA analysis linked Avni to 5 of the 13 people died in the animal attack. All efforts of finding the tigress with sniffer dogs, Thermal Imaging drones, elephant patrolling and luring the tigress with cologne scent were unsuccessful as the area had heavy growth of Lantana camara which made it easy for the her to hide and take cover. Presence of one more tiger was also known in the region. Apparently, the citizens appealed to the President Ram Nath Kovind and the Prime Minister Narendra Modi to protect the tigress by running a campaign #LetAvniLive and several marches in cities across the nation. It is said that the killing orders were issued to clear the land from tiger occupancy so that industries could be set up in the area. Post-mortem reports suggested she was killed by single bullet wound and no attempts were made to tranquilize or capture the tigress while still being alive. The forest department personnel are equipped and trained with tranquilising guns to capture the protected animal alive but still a private hunter was brought in to kill and later rewarded.

Many violations of standard protocols were committed in this incidence. (1) The orders were issued in the name of the father but his son shot the tigress. (2) Such operations begin with sunrise and end at sunset. Tigress was killed in the Night. (3) At time of killing, wildlife veterinarian or any senior forest department official were not present with the hunting team. (4) In a statement, the team mentioned attempt to tranquilize the tigress failed and when she attacked, the person shot the tigress in self defense. How the "scheduled drug" used to sedate the tigress was handled in absence of a trained vet or wildlife expert raises doubts. (5) Spot panchanama suggests the possibility of manual piercing of dart into the skin. (6) Tigress body had no signs of resistance.

Habitat Loss
In the past 100 years, tigers have lost almost 93% of their global historic habitat ranges in the wild. Habitat loss leads to fragmentation and isolation of existing population. Having increased agricultural areas that surround forests and other reserved areas act as an extension of natural habitats which results in tiger-human conflict which tragically results in both human fatalities and retaliatory killing of tigers

Sunderban is known for abundant tigers and its preys. The world's largest mangrove forest area is threatened by clearing of trees to meet charcoal demand and for prawn fishing in the swamps. Construction of floating hotels and floating casinos are proposed along with helipad and golf course by tourist company that will have adverse effect on the delicate ecosystem by disrupting the traditional symbiotic way of life and livelihood of people living in the region. 2018 survey showed Tiger Reserves at Achanakamar, Buxa, Dudhwa, Mukundara, Panna, Rajaji, Sanjay-Dubri, Sariska, and Udanti-Sitanadi are facing pressure due to livestock overgrazing.

Population

Tigers have the potential to expand its population rapidly. A female tiger attains sexual maturity at the age of three and can produce litters of usually 2 or 3 but up to 6 or 7 fast growing cubs after a gestation of only three and a half months. If all the newborns in litter die, the female tiger can give birth to the next litter within five months. Juvenile mortality rate is high among the tigers with about 50% cubs not surviving till the second year. Cubs remain with their mothers up to the age of two. Male tigers become sexually active after the age of four. At the most, lifespan of a tiger may reach up to 20 years.

In the 1900s, at the beginning of the century, more than 100,000 Bengal Tigers were believed to have roamed all over the country. While some estimates put the number to a more conservative figure of 80,000. Artists in Taxidermy, Van Ingen & Van Ingen of Mysore accounts to having stuffed more than 25,000 tigers in first 50 years of their business. More than 50,000 tigers were estimated in 1930. From the 1930s onwards, factory records reveal that Van Ingen & Van Ingen would process over 400 Tigers per year till the 1960s. At the time of Independence from British Rule, India had estimated around 40,000 tigers in the year 1947. The first country-wide tiger census in 1972 put the numbers to 1,827 tigers. Implementation of Project Tiger saw the tiger population to rise up to 3,500 in the 1990s. For the year 2018-19, estimation was 2,967 tigers in the wild with over half of the population found in the states of Madhya Pradesh and Karnataka put together.

India saw a 44% surge in tiger deaths in the 10 years 2011-21 with 1059 deaths in the time period. Madhya Pradesh recorded the highest number of deaths in these ten years, followed by Maharshtra and Karnataka. The number of deaths have increased from 88 in 2012 to 127 in 2021.

Tiger Signs
Presence of the tiger can be confirmed by observing the following seven signs
Pugmark Trails
Scats / Faeces (Old: dry with hair and bones visible, Fresh: dry but intact with shiny surface, Very Fresh: soft, moist, and smelly)
Scrapes
Scent marks (spray, rolling)
Rake marks on trunks
Actual sighting
Roaring

Tiger Census

After the Sariska incident in 2004-05, where all the tigers were lost due to poaching but the official records showed presence of tiger population based on the pugmark census, Tiger Task Force (TTF) was constituted which recommended changes in the population assessment method. With several methodologies available for conducting tiger census and lack of uniform data collection methodology and information on survey often results in difficulty to make comparisons or draw inferences from such data. It demands for a good scientific design in implementing an effective monitoring scheme for tigers and their habitats. The forest department has been making use of Camera Traps, GPS, Pedometers and other modern equipment in the tiger population studies.

The 2018-19 assessment (fourth cycle) done in 20 states covering 381,400 sq km area which was divided in 317,958 habitat plots with an investment of 620,795 man-days is considered to be the world's largest wildlife survey ever undertaken that put the nation-wide population estimate at 2,967 tigers (SE range 2,603 to 3,346). 65% of total tiger population (1,923) were found inside the Tiger Reserves. The exercise of tiger census is done once every four years. From the fifth cycle of population estimation, during 2022, India is making use of digital means in the form of M-STrIPES application.

Population estimates in India since implementation of the new assessment methodology is

M-STrIPES
Monitoring System for Tigers: Intensive Protection and Ecological Status (M-STrIPES) is a digital platform used by the forest frontline staff which facilitates patrolling, assesses ecological status and aids in mitigating human-wildlife
conflict in and around tiger reserves effectively. The M-STrIPES program uses GPS, General Packet Radio Service (GPRS), and remote sensing, to collect information from the field and creates a database using modern Information Technology (IT) based tools. Later, the collected data is used to analyze the information using GIS and statistical tools to provide inferences that allow tiger reserve managers to improve their wildlife managerial protocols.

Camera Traps
Camera traps are photographic devices equipped with motion sensors which captures the image or video when any animal passes nearby. The Guinness World Records recognized the country's efforts as the world's largest camera trap survey of wildlife in 2018-19. Across 141 different sites and in 26,838 locations, these camera traps were set up to survey an area of 121,337 square kilometers capturing 34,858,623 photographs of wildlife in which 76,651 were tigers. These images were then fed to a stripe-pattern-recognition software which identified 2,461 individual tigers (excluding cubs).

TX2

TX2 (Tiger times 2) goal is the global commitment driven by World Wide Fund for Nature (formerly World Wildlife Fund, WWF) and undertaken by 13 range governments at the St Petersburg Tiger Summit (2010) to double the global tiger population in the wild by 2022 by giving priority, effort, innovation and investment for the recovery of tiger population. India achieved this TX2 feat in 2018, four years ahead of the set target. In order to bring the countries together for prioritizing tiger conservation and management globally, Global Tiger Day celebration was announced on 29 July at St Petersburg Tiger Summit 2010.

Polymorphism
Sometimes a tiger with fur colour other than classical orange is recorded in India. These can be Black tiger, Golden tiger or White tiger variants. This polymorphism is due to genetic reasons. 2018 survey found pictures captured in camera-traps of a golden tiger in Kaziranga Tiger Reserve and a black phenotype in Similipal Tiger Reserve.

Conservation

As an apex predator, tigers are indicators of a healthy ecosystem. Conservation of tigers ensure the sustenance of healthy populations of herbivores and other carnivores. Survival of tigers in the wild is dependent on the conservation and management efforts. On 1 April 1973, Government of India launched Project Tiger to ensure maintenance of a viable population of Tigers in India for scientific, economic, aesthetic, cultural and ecological values, and to preserve for all times, areas of biological importance as a national heritage for the benefit, education and enjoyment of the people. Implementation of this conservation project over the years has highlighted the need for statutory institutional mechanism with administrative powers and legal backing which resulted in creation of National Tiger Conservation Authority(NTCA) on 4 September 2006. Highest degree of protection to tiger is provided under this law. Committed goal-oriented efforts and investment in tiger conservation have produced desirable results.

India has signed bilateral agreements China, Cambodia, Bangladesh, Nepal, Bhutan, Myanmar and Russia to address issues of mutual concern for Tiger conservation.

To deal with reintroduction and supplementation in the areas that were once known for presence of tigers but presently have none or reduced tiger density, NTCA in 2022, released SOP titled, Tiger Reintroduction and Supplementation in Wild Protocol which has taken into account the scientific knowledge on the topic and conditions that are typical to India in order to effectively achieve the objective.

Securing Habitat

Protected Areas (PA) were set up in India that served as refuge for the wild animals who were threatened by habitat loss due to anthropological pressures. Some of these protected areas were later identified as reserves. Tigers require vast region of undisturbed terrain with sufficient prey numbers so that they can repopulate and maintain the stable demographic and genetic continuance. In 1973, nine tiger reserves were declared as protected under law with cumulative area of approximately 18,278 sq.km. By 2018, it was expanded to fifty tiger reserves with nearly 72,749 sq.km. of protected area which formed about 2.21% of India's total geographical area.
As of July 2022, India has created 52 tiger reserves. These tiger reserves have played important role in the success of Project Tiger since its inception. Preventing habitat fragmentation and effectively managing the area under conversation benefits the wildlife.

According to 2018 survey, tiger occupancy was found to be stable at an area 88,985 sq km across the country since 2014 estimate (88,558 sq km).

Tiger Reserves
A "tiger reserve" is legally mandated to designate a critical "core area" wherein human interference is strictly prohibited. A "buffer zone" surrounds the core-area, wherein conservation intent is to be prioritized over other land uses. Breeding populations of tigers are extensively in the core area of tiger reserves. The size of these tiger reserves in India vary between 344 sq. km. to 3,150 sq. km. with an average area of average 1,321 sq. km.

2018 assessment shows Corbett Tiger Reserve with the largest population of about 231 tigers. Tiger Reserves at Bandhavgarh, Bandipur, Nagarhole, Mudumalai and Kaziranga each had over a hundred tigers while Dudhwa, Kanha, Tadoba, Sathyamangalam and Sundarbans Tiger Reserves had over 80 tigers each. Buxa and Dampa Tiger Reserves showed absence of population as these places are historically known for their poor tiger status. Deficiency in tiger numbers was seen at Indravati, Udanti-Sitanadi and Achanakmar Tiger Reserves owing to unsatisfactory law and order situation. Tiger numbers at other places like Amrabad, Anshi Dandeli, Buxa, Dampa, Kawal, Manas, Nagarjunsagar Sri Sailam, Nameri, Pakke, Palamau, Sanjay-Dubri and Similipal Tiger Reserves are below their potential. Targeted management with enhanced resources can yield positive results.

Core, Buffer and Corridor
Tiger conservation follows the principle of "core-buffer-corridor". Core area is highly protected while buffer zones are in the periphery of the core area. Buffer area is meant for multiple use with community participation for supporting tiger conservation. Corridors are the areas between the larger reserved forests which serves as the connecting geographical section of habitat that enables wildlife to move freely through the landscape. However, many of these corridors are not designated as protected areas and are prone to degradation due unsustainable human activities and developmental projects undertaken in these eco-sensitive areas. NTCA has prioritized the protection, conservation and development of corridors at the national level due to its significance in ensuring tiger population growth. These corridors would ensure genetic exchange through dispersal. The corridors would also serve to guard against extinction risks caused by environmental and man-made factors. Nature Conservation Foundation under the grant of Project Tiger is working on the conservation of corridors in Cauvery-MM Hills-BR Hills landscape. 

Funds from Compensatory Afforestation Fund Management and Planning Authority (CAMPA) are being utilized for promoting voluntary village resettlement from core areas of the Tiger Reserves.

Conservation Assured Tiger Standards (CA|TS)
In 2020, the NTCA and the Ministry of Environment, Forest and Climate Change of India have announced the adoption of the Conservation Assured Tiger Standards (CA|TS) to all the tiger reserves covering over 7000 sq. km. land area which sets minimum standards to manage tiger species, and encourages assessments to benchmark progress. As of July 2021, 14 Tiger Reserves in India - Manas, Kaziranga, Orang, Satpura, Pench, Kanha, Panna, Valmiki, Dudhwa, Parambikulam, Mudumalai, Bandipur, Anamalai and Sundarbans - have been awarded with international CA|TS accreditation. Efforts are on to bring in more Tiger Reserves under CA|TS accreditation.

Anti-Poaching Activities

The tiger is also protected under the Convention on International Trade in Endangered Species of Wild Fauna and Flora (CITES). Use of technology to improve patrolling and monitoring the tiger reserves reduces the poaching incidents. Better equipping the rangers of the forest decreases the threat of poaching and ensures the area is a safe haven for tigers and other wildlife moving through it.

Forest officials on efficient vigil with M-STrIPES implementation, use of wireless communication devices, suitable gears and weapons for patrolling guards is important to boost the morale and increase the show of strength in vulnerable Protected Areas.

Reducing Tiger-Human Conflict
While increase in the population leads tiger often breaching the formal protected areas of forests and roam outside the reserve perimeter to establish a new territory, the natural habitat destruction results in the decline of prey numbers hence the tiger looks for its food in human settlements. Both leads to increase in events of Tiger-Human conflicts. Research Institutes like Wildlife Institute of India are playing key role in studying and aiding government initiatives to bring down the number of such untoward instances.

India is working on a plan to use LIDAR based survey technology to reduce the incidence of conflict.

Sustainable Livelihood Development
Maharashtra Forest Department has effectively managed to reduce the tiger-human conflict with the help of NGOs and grassroots organisations in providing the alternate source of energy and livelihood thereby reducing the dependence of local people on the forest resources and ensuring maintenance of forest cover for the long term survival of 200 odd tigers in their territory. Both conservation and development can happen in a mutually complementary manner. India needs to prosper both economically and environmentally. Implementation of community-based ecotourism model provides livelihood opportunities to the locals around the Tiger Reserves.

Raising Awareness
Civil society organisations and NGOs often join hands with local population to motivate them to support the conservation efforts. Local youth often support the forest staff in patrolling and wildlife monitoring. 

World Wide Fund for Nature (WWF), Wildlife Protection Society of India (WPSI) and Wildlife Conservation Society (WCS) are some of the organizations working actively in the Indian tiger conservation forefront.

Trivia
Machhali, a famous Bengal tigress from the Ranthambore National Park, is the most widely photographed tiger in the world.

See also
Project Tiger

References

Further reading
 
 
 
 

Hunting in India
Tigers in India